Timbe may refer to:

 Timbé people, an ethnic group of Brazil
 Timbé language, a language of Brazil
 Timbe language, a language of Papua New Guinea
 Timbé, Ivory Coast, a town in Ivory Coast
 Timbé do Sul, a municipality in Brazil

See also 
 Tinbe (disambiguation)
 Tembe (disambiguation)

Language and nationality disambiguation pages